Miguelina Cobián Hechevarria (19 December 1941 – 1 December 2019) was a Cuban sprinter. She was a member of the 4 x 100 metres relay team that won a silver at the 1968 Summer Olympics, the first Olympic medal ever achieved by Cuban women.

After retiring from competition, she coached youth athletes in the Sports Initiation Schools and the Superior School of Athletic Improvement. In November 2005, she was inducted into the Central American and Caribbean Confederation Hall of Fame.

Cobián died on 1 December 2019 at the age of 77.

References

External links
 

1941 births
2019 deaths
Cuban female sprinters
Cuban people of African descent
Sportspeople from Santiago de Cuba
Olympic athletes of Cuba
Olympic silver medalists for Cuba
Athletes (track and field) at the 1963 Pan American Games
Athletes (track and field) at the 1967 Pan American Games
Athletes (track and field) at the 1964 Summer Olympics
Athletes (track and field) at the 1968 Summer Olympics
Pan American Games medalists in athletics (track and field)
Medalists at the 1968 Summer Olympics
Pan American Games gold medalists for Cuba
Pan American Games silver medalists for Cuba
Olympic silver medalists in athletics (track and field)
Universiade medalists in athletics (track and field)
Central American and Caribbean Games gold medalists for Cuba
Competitors at the 1962 Central American and Caribbean Games
Competitors at the 1966 Central American and Caribbean Games
Competitors at the 1970 Central American and Caribbean Games
Universiade bronze medalists for Cuba
Central American and Caribbean Games medalists in athletics
Medalists at the 1963 Summer Universiade
Medalists at the 1965 Summer Universiade
Medalists at the 1963 Pan American Games
Medalists at the 1967 Pan American Games
Olympic female sprinters
20th-century Cuban women
20th-century Cuban people